Sahba Aminikia (Persian: صهبا امینی کیا) (born August 27, 1981) is an Iranian-born American contemporary music composer, artistic director, performer, and educator. Aminikia is the founder and the artistic director of Flying Carpet Festival, a performing arts festival for children in war zones.

His musical compositions have been widely performed around the world by contemporary classical ensembles orchestras, and bands, including the Kronos Quartet, Brooklyn Youth Chorus, San Francisco Girls Chorus, Mahsa Vahdat, Shahram Nazeri, International Contemporary Ensemble, Carnegie Hall Ensemble Connect, Minnesotal Philharmonic Orchestra, Symphony Parnassus, Ensemble Elefant, ZOFO Duet, San Francisco Conservatory of Music New Music Ensemble, Mobius Trio, Delphi Trio, Amaranth Quartet, Living Earth Show, One Found Sound, and Afghanistan National Institute of Music.

Early Years
Sahba Aminikia was born in 1981 in Tehran, Iran; during the Iran-Iraq War. Raised during a religious theocracy, in a poetic yet chaotic society, he had been exposed to the influences of poets such as Hafiz, Rumi, Forough Farrokhzad and Ahmad Shamlu, as well as traditional, classical and jazz music and the music of Shostakovich, Reza Vali, Stravinsky, Philip Glass, Osvaldo Golijov, Aziza Mustafazadeh, Pink Floyd, The Beatles, and Queen during his upbringing.

Education
Sahba Aminikia has been trained in musical composition under Iranian pianists Nikan Milani, Safa Shahidi, Gagik Babayan, and perhaps most influenced by work with his first composition teacher, Mehran Rouhani, a graduate of Royal Academy of Music and a former student of Sir Michael Tippett. He later relocated to St. Petersburg, Russia where he studied music composition at the St. Petersburg State Conservatory under Boris Tishchenko, a life-time student of Dmitri Shostakovich. 

He also has received his Bachelor of Music and Master of Music with honors at San Francisco Conservatory of Music, where he studied with David Garner, David Conte, Daniel J. Becker, and Conrad Susa. He has also received lessons from Richard Danielpour, Osvaldo Golijov, John Corigliano, and John Adams (composer). During his graduate studies at San Francisco Conservatory of Music, Aminikia was the proud recipient of a Phyllis C. Wattis Foundation scholarship.

Work
Sahba Aminkia’s compositions have been widely performed in United States, Canada, Iran, United Arab Emirates, Brazil, Ecuador, France, Italy, Poland, China, Greece, Turkey and Israel and at venues such as Kennedy Center for the Performing Arts, Le Poisson Rouge, Yerba Buena Center for the Arts, San Francisco Exploratorium, SFJAZZ Center and St. Ann's Warehouse. Aminikia’s compositions have been commissioned by theatre troops, contemporary classical ensembles, film scores, Persian traditional music groups as well as jazz bands including Kronos Quartet, Brooklyn Youth Chorus, Symphony Parnassus, San Francisco Conservatory of Music, New Music Ensemble, Mobius Trio, Delphi Trio, and Living Earth Show. His third string quartet, "A Threnody for Those Who Remain", commissioned by Yerba Buena Center for the Arts and Kronos Performing Arts Association, was described by Financial Times as “An experience not to be easily forgotten”. And similarly, his widely known “Tar o Pood” (Warp and Weft)—commissioned by Nasrin Marzban for Kronos Quartet—was the second-place recipient of the 2015 American Prize in composition in the Professional Chamber Music category. As part of a Virtual reality experience, he wrote the music for "Sea Prayer" by The Guardian based on a story by the acclaimed author Khalid Hosseini which was performed by Kronos Quartet and British multi-instrumentalist, David Coulter. The piece is a tribute to the memory of Iraqi refugee, Alan Kurdi and was published on the anniversary of Kurdi’s death on the shores of the Mediterranean sea. Aminikia was the artist-in-residence at Kronos Festival 2017, an annual festival held by legendary Kronos Quartet at San Francisco SFJAZZ Center throughout which ten of his works including five new pieces were premiered. His most recent piece for the same festival,”Music of Spheres” was a collaboration between Kronos Quartet, San Francisco Girls Chorus and Afghanistan National Institute of Music which resulted in a 25-minute choral piece named "Music of Spheres" which is published in February 2018 by Orange Mountain Music, Philip Glass’ record label. A compilation of his early works are also published by Hermes Records in Tehran, Iran. 

Aminikia is also the Artistic Director for Flying Carpet Festival, a mobile music festival that serves children in need in war zones. He also serves as the Director for Sirkhane, a non-profit organization based in Mardin, Southern Turkey which has served around 400,000 children through circus arts and music.

Awards and honors
 2017: Artist-in-residence at Kronos Festival 2017: Here and Now
 2015: American Prize - Professional Chamber Music Division - 2nd Place
 2014: Stone Fellow Composer, Great Lakes Chamber Music Festival, Bloomfield, Michigan
 2012: Winner of Shanghai-San Francisco International Chamber Music Festival Composition Competition.
 2010: Phyllis Wattis Foundation Scholarship
 2010: ASCAP Morton Gould Young Composer Awards Finalist

References

External links
 Sahba Aminikia's Website
 Iranian-Born Composer Sahba Aminikia Bridges Worlds in Extreme Times

Living people
1981 births
Iranian composers
Musicians from San Francisco
San Francisco Conservatory of Music alumni
American male classical composers
American Bahá'ís
Iranian emigrants to the United States